Emanuele Michetti is an Italian director, screenwriter, Film editor, and colorist.
He lives in New York City.

He has produced narrative films, documentaries, music videos, and video art projects. With a focus on social issues such as mental illness, discrimination, gender equality, and minorities, his stories are mostly about loneliness and alienation in modern times, often featuring characters who are rejected by society and face internal struggles.

His films has been screened at festivals such as Cannes Film Festival, Montreal World Film Festival, the Academy Award Qualifying Urbanworld Film Festival, Turin Film festival.

Filmography as director and screenwriter

References

External links

 
 Emanuele Michetti at official web site
 Interview at Manifesto 0
 Biography at Manifesto 0

Italian film directors
Living people
Year of birth missing (living people)